Fury's Order (foaled in New Zealand), 1970 was a thoroughbred horse, who raced successfully in New Zealand and Australia.

He is notable for winning major races including the Cox Plate when ridden by Brent Thomson, Australia's premier weight-for-age race, and the New Zealand Cup.

Big race wins
 1975 Cox Plate
 1974 Hawkes Bay Cup 
 1974 New Zealand Cup 
 1973 New Zealand 2000 Guineas
 1973 New Zealand Derby
 1973 Wellington Guineas

Death
After racing, Fury's Order retired to Stud in Australia, where he achieved only very moderate success. After standing at stud for 5–6 years, he was struck by lightning in his paddock and died instantly.

See also

 Thoroughbred racing in New Zealand
 Horseracing in New Zealand

References

1970 racehorse births
1983 racehorse deaths
Cox Plate winners
New Zealand Cup winners
Racehorses bred in New Zealand
Racehorses trained in New Zealand
Thoroughbred family 22-b